Patricio Damián Tanda (born 5 April 2002) is an Argentine professional footballer who plays as a midfielder for Racing Club.

Career
Tanda had early youth career stints with Alberdi de Burzaco and Almafuerte de San José, which preceded the midfielder's arrival at Boca Juniors. Whilst with Boca, he also appeared for local clubs Cultural Mármol and Olimpia de Lomas de Zamora. 2018 saw Tanda depart Boca for Racing Club. He made the breakthrough into their first-team in November 2020, with the midfielder making his senior debut on 19 November in a 2–0 defeat away to Atlético Tucumán in the Copa de la Liga Profesional; he played the full duration, aged eighteen.

Career statistics
.

Notes

References

External links

2002 births
Living people
People from Lomas de Zamora
Argentine footballers
Association football midfielders
Racing Club de Avellaneda footballers
Sportspeople from Buenos Aires Province